Margaretha Sigfridsson (born 28 January 1976) is a Swedish curler who in 2009 was inducted into the Swedish Curling Hall of Fame.

Curling career

Early career
Sigfridsson skipped the Swedish team at the 1997 World Junior Curling Championships, winning the silver medal. Sweden lost in the final game 11–3 to Scotland, skipped by Julia Ewart.

Sigfridsson was the Swedish skip at the 2002 Ford World Women's Curling Championship. Once again, she won a silver medal, and once again lost to Scotland (this time, skipped by Jackie Lockhart) in the final. The score was 6–5.

2006–2011
Sigfridsson would later join the Stina Viktorsson rink, at first playing second, and then becoming lead in 2007. Sigfridsson would return to the Worlds as a member of the Viktorsson rink at the World Championships in 2008, finishing in sixth place. The team would win their first World Curling Tour event the next season, winning the 2008 Stockholm Ladies Cup. Later in the season, Sigfridsson temporarily joined the Anette Norberg rink as lead, and the team won a silver medal at the 2009 Mount Titlis World Women's Curling Championship, losing to China's Wang Bingyu in the final.  Sigfridsson won a gold medal at the 2010 European Curling Championships with Viktorsson. In 2010-11, the Viktorsson rink would play in their first two Grand Slam events. They played in the 2010 Manitoba Lotteries Women's Curling Classic, winning 4 games before being eliminated, and at the 2011 Players' Championship, winning just two games.

2011–present
In 2011, Viktorsson left the rink, and Sigfridsson took over as skip, but would still throw first stones. The team brought in Maria Prytz to throw last rocks. The team quickly became the top team in Sweden, and would represent the country at the 2011 European Curling Championships where they won a silver medal, losing to Scotland's Eve Muirhead rink. As Sweden's representative at the 2012 Ford World Women's Curling Championship, the Sigfridsson rink won the silver medal, losing to Switzerland's Mirjam Ott in the final match. The team won one WCT event in the season, the 2011 Credit Suisse Women's Masters Basel. They played in on Grand Slam event, the 2011 Manitoba Lotteries Women's Curling Classic, winning four games.

The team would again represent Sweden at the 2012 European Curling Championships where they won the bronze medal. Despite losing the 2013 Swedish final to Anette Norberg, the Sigfridsson rink was selected to represent Sweden at the 2013 World Women's Curling Championship. The team would again win a silver medal at the Worlds, losing to Scotland's Muirhead in the final. Sigfridsson and Muirhead would meet once again at the end of the season in the 2013 Players' Championship final, where she again lost to Muirhead. It would be the first time Sigfridsson would make the playoffs at a Grand Slam event. The team played in one other Slam that season, the 2012 Manitoba Lotteries Women's Curling Classic, winning four games. They won one Tour event, the 2012 Women's Masters Basel.

In November 2013, Sigfridsson led Sweden to another gold medal at the 2013 European Curling Championships. She continued this success towards the 2014 Winter Olympics, where she led Sweden to a silver medal, after losing to Canada's Jennifer Jones in the final. A month later, she represented Sweden at the 2014 Ford World Women's Curling Championship where she fared a much worse record, placing 5th. The team played in three Slams in the season, winning just two games at the 2013 Manitoba Liquor & Lotteries Women's Classic, losing in the quarterfinals of the 2013 Masters of Curling and losing in the semifinals of the 2014 Players' Championship.

The Sigfridsson rink started the 2014-15 season by winning the 2014 Stockholm Ladies Cup. She skipped Sweden at the 2015 World Women's Curling Championship, leading her team to a 5-6 round robin record, missing the playoffs. She would again skip team Sweden at the 2016 World Women's Curling Championship, leading her team to a worse 4-7 record. The next season the team replaced Prytz with Cecilia Östlund throwing last stones. They would not be named to represent Sweden internationally that season, having been replaced by the Anna Hasselborg rink.

Personal life
Sigfridsson lives in Sundsvall.

Grand Slam record

Former events

References

External links
 

Living people
1976 births
People from Sundsvall
People from Härjedalen
Swedish female curlers
Olympic curlers of Sweden
Olympic silver medalists for Sweden
Olympic medalists in curling
Curlers at the 2014 Winter Olympics
Medalists at the 2014 Winter Olympics
European curling champions
Swedish curling champions
Continental Cup of Curling participants
Sportspeople from Västernorrland County